"Blind Spot" is a 1994 episode of the American television series Beverly Hills, 90210. The episode follows two stories. In the first, series regular David Silver finds himself attracted to his blind piano teacher, causing a strain on his relationship with girlfriend Donna Martin. In the second, series regular Steve Sanders discovers that Mike Ryan, the president of his college fraternity, is gay, and outs him to the rest of the fraternity. The 26th episode of season 4, "Blind Spot" originally aired on April 6, 1994 on Fox.

Plot
David Silver (Brian Austin Green) is having trouble practicing a Mozart sonata so he seeks out help from Holly Marlow, a piano teacher who he quickly realizes is blind. He develops feelings for her, slighting his girlfriend Donna Martin (Tori Spelling) in the process. Holly explains to David that he is confusing feelings of protectiveness because of her disability for romantic feelings.

Steve Sanders (Ian Ziering) and Brandon Walsh (Jason Priestley) are on their way to Dodger Stadium for a baseball game when Brandon's car breaks down. They go into a nearby coffee house to call for help and Steve figures out that it's a gay establishment. He spots Mike Ryan, the president of his fraternity, and Mike spots him as well. Back at the fraternity house Mike asks Steve not to mention his sexuality to the fraternity brothers. At a wardrobe fitting for a charity beefcake calendar, fraternity brother Artie Devers gay-baits Steve, who in response outs Mike. Artie leads an attempt to expel Mike from the fraternity but Steve, extolling the principle of brotherhood, persuades the fraternity to keep Mike.

Guest cast
 Jack Armstrong as Mike Ryan
 Cress Williams as D'Shawn Hardell
 Todd Bryant as Artie Devers
 Sydney Brown as Holly Marlow

Impact
Gender theorist E. Graham McKinley has examined "Blind Spot" for its portrayal of gender relationship dynamics between diverse pairings, specifically David's interaction with the disabled Holly and a date between Donna and recurring African-American character D'Shawn Hardell.

In partnership with the Los Angeles chapter of the Gay & Lesbian Alliance Against Defamation, the producers of Beverly Hills, 90210 sponsored screenings of "Blind Spot" at three gay and lesbian youth centers in the Los Angeles area. Following each screening, executive producer Chuck Rosin and guest star Todd Bryant participated in a question-and-answer session.

Notes

References
 McKinley, E. Graham (1997). Beverly Hills, 90210: Television, Gender and Identity. University of Pennsylvania Press. .
 Tropiano, Stephen (2002). The Prime Time Closet: A History of Gays and Lesbians on TV. New York, Applause Theatre and Cinema Books. .

External links
 "Blind Spot" at the Internet Movie Database

Beverly Hills, 90210 (franchise)
1994 American television episodes
American LGBT-related television episodes
Television episodes about anti-LGBT sentiment
Television episodes set in Beverly Hills, California